Whole-body nuclear scanning is a medical imaging technique where the whole body is scanned, contrary to, e.g., neuroimaging where only the brain is scanned. 

Whole-body nuclear scanning may refer to several different modalities:
 Nuclear magnetic resonance imaging, also known more commonly as magnetic resonance imaging (MRI)
 But normally it would probably refer to a nuclear medicine tomographic imaging technique such as:
 Single photon emission computed tomography (SPECT)
 Positron emission tomography (PET)